Arunabh Sarkar (born 29 May 1941) is a Bangladeshi poet, columnist, literary editor, and freedom fighter. He was born in Tangail, Bangladesh. He received the 2009 Bangla Academy Literary Award for poetry, Arunabh also received the Tangail Sahitya Sangsad Poetry Award for 2007. He has published three collection of poems : Nagare Baul, Keu Kichhui Jane Na, and Narira Fere Na. Sarkar also edited the poetry magazine Eshika from 1969 to 1985  and has been a journalist for some 40 years.

References 

Living people
1941 births
Bengali Hindus
Bangladeshi Hindus
Bangladeshi male poets
Recipients of Bangla Academy Award